Chestnut Ridge Natural Area Preserve is a Natural Area Preserve located in Giles County, Virginia.  A  tract of old-growth forest, it is dominated by northern red oak and chestnut oak.  The extent of unbroken forest on the property is unusual for southwestern Virginia; many of the trees, including cucumber magnolia and American basswood, are between three and four hundred years old.

Chestnut Ridge Natural Area Preserve is privately owned, although it is monitored by the Virginia Department of Conservation and Recreation. Prior arrangements with the 500-Year Forest Foundation is required prior to any visitation.

See also
 List of Virginia Natural Area Preserves

References

External links
 Virginia Department of Conservation and Recreation

Virginia Natural Area Preserves
Protected areas of Giles County, Virginia